Vili Tolutau (born January 26, 1994) is an American rugby union player who plays as a forward for the New England Free Jacks in Major League Rugby (MLR). He also represents America playing for the United States men's national team.

Prior to joining the Free Jacks, Tolutau played for the Seattle Seawolves for 2 full seasons and the shortened 2020 MLR season. Tolutau was a part of two-time championship winning Seawolves in 2018 and 2019, as well as being the MVP of the Championship Match in 2018.

Tolutau previously represented the United States at the international level with several age-grade sides. Tolutau also previously played for the USA Falcons, the developmental side for the United States men's national rugby sevens team.

Early life
Vili Tolutau was born on January 26, 1994. Tolutau attended Baldwin High School and began playing rugby with the Maui Warriors as a teenager. After graduating from Baldwin High School, Tolutau attended Central Washington University, playing for the school's rugby teams and graduating in June 2018 with a bachelor's degree in construction management.

Club career
It was announced in April 2018 that Tolutau had signed with the Seattle Seawolves for Major League Rugby's (MLR) inaugural 2018 season. Tolutau made his debut for the Seawolves on April 23, appearing as a first half substitute in a 39–23 victory over San Diego. Tolutau scored his first try for the Seawolves on April 29, starting at flanker in a 19–15 defeat to Glendale. Tolutau was named Most Valuable Player (equivalent to man of the match) in the 2018 Major League Rugby Final, as the Seawolves won the championship match 23–19. Tolutau was also named to the All-MLR First Team, at flanker, for the 2018 season.

International career

USA High School All-Americans
Tolutau first represented the United States as a member of the United States men's national under-19 team (High School All-Americans) for two consecutive years, while a member of the Maui Warriors.

USA Junior All-Americans
Tolutau represented the United States playing for the United States men's national under-20 team (Junior All-Americans) in the 2013 IRB Junior World Championship.

USA Collegiate All-Americans
Tolutau played for the United States men's national under-23 team (Collegiate All-Americans) for two years.

USA Selects
In September 2018, it was announced that Tolutau had been selected for the USA Selects roster for the 2018 Americas Pacific Challenge (APC). Tolutau made his debut with the Selects on October 6, 2018, appearing as a substitute and scoring a try, in the Selects' 39–30 defeat to Tonga in the APC.

USA Eagles
Tolutau made his debut with the USA Eagles on June 23, 2018, appearing as a substitute (playing at flanker), in the Eagles' 42–17 victory against Canada in a mid-year test.

USA Falcons
Tolutau has competed for the USA Falcons, the developmental side for the United States men's national rugby sevens team, at the Las Vegas Invitational Tournament.

References

1994 births
Living people
American rugby union players
United States international rugby union players
Rugby union flankers
Sportspeople from Hawaii
Seattle Seawolves players
Rugby union hookers
New England Free Jacks players